Christopher Yohmei Blasdel (クリストファー遙盟、 born 1951 in Canyon, Texas) is a shakuhachi performer, researcher and writer specializing in the music of Japan and Asia.  In 1972, while on foreign study in Tokyo, he was introduced to the Kinko Style shakuhachi master (later designated  "Living National Treasure") Goro Yamaguchi, whom he studied with until Yamaguchi’s death in 1999.  In 1975, Blasdel began learning Aikido under Yasuo Kobayashi and performing with the butoh dancer Akira Kasai at his studio, Tenshikan. Blasdel presently holds a 4th degree black belt in Aikido.

In 1978, Blasdel entered the Musicology Faculty at Tokyo National University of Fine Arts (Geidai) with a scholarship from the Japanese government. He studied traditional Japanese and Asian music under the pioneering ethnomusicologist Fumio Koizumi and the Noh scholar Mario Yokomichi. He studied the ancient Myôan Style shakuhachi from Chikugai Okamoto and ensemble techniques from shamisen/koto master and Living National Treasure Kunie Fujii and gagaku ryûteki flute under Sukeyasu Shiba. Blasdel graduated from Geidai with an MFA in 1982. In 1984, he received his shihan master teaching license and professional name, Yohmei, from Yamaguchi—the first of only two non-Japanese ever accredited by Yamaguchi.

Blasdel began working part-time at the International House of Japan in 1988 as advisor to their arts program and curator of the Japan-US Friendship Commission Creative Artists’ Exchange Program. In 2005, he was promoted to Artistic Director of the International House. He taught Japanese music at International Christian University from 2001 to 2006 and at Temple University, Japan campus from 2002. He also taught as guest professor at Earlham College in 1988 and Chulalongkorn University in Bangkok in 1991.

Blasdel is the senior artistic advisor to the annual Prague Shakuhachi Festival. He also co-organized the Boulder World Shakuhachi Festival in 1998 and the World Shakuhachi Festival, Sydney in 2008. He was featured in the Sarawak Rainforest World Music Festival in 2004 and numerous other festivals and concert tours introducing Japanese music to the world. To date he has made a total of eight CDs of classical and contemporary shakuhachi music. He has added shakuhachi music to live readings of such distinguished poets as  John Logan, Kenneth Rexroth, Sam Hamill, Makoto Ooka and Leza Lowitz.

His publications in English include The Shakuhachi, A Manual for Learning originally published in 1988 by Ongaku no Tomo-sha, the first book on shakuhachi technique and history in the English language published by a major publishing company (later re-written and published by Printed Matter Press in 2008). In 2006, Ongaku no Tomo-sha published the Japanese version of this manual. In 2005, Printed Matter Press published his semi-autobiographic account of his life in Japan The Single Tone, A Personal Journey into Shakuhachi Music.

His Japanese publications include Shakuhachi Odessei—Ten no Neiro ni Miserarete (「尺八オデッセイ—天の音色に魅せられて」Kawade Shobo Shinsha, 2000, translated and adapted into English as The Single Tone). This work was awarded the Sixth Rennyo Prize for Non Fiction in 1999.

Discography
Night of the Garuda   迦楼羅の夜、 Teichiku Records, Tokyo, 1986
Voices from Afar, Voices from Within   遙なる笛、Teichiku Records, Tokyo, 1986
Zen Reveries   禅問答、Moon Bridge, Portland, 1996
Heart of Bamboo   ハートオブバンブー、Copper Canyon Press, Port Townsend, WA, 1999　
Bamboo Voice—Human Flute   竹の声、人の笛、Far East Records, Tokyo 2002
Visionary Tones   浩々妙音、Bright One Records, Tokyo, 2005
breathplay   息遊、2007
NAVARASA   A collaboration with acoustic bass player Mark Izu、2010

External links
Christopher Yohmei’s website  
The International House of Japan, Inc. website 
Aikido Kobayashi Dojo website 
Prague Shakuhachi Festival 
Japan Times Review of The Shakuhachi--A Manual for Learning 
Japan Times Review of The Single Tone—A Personal Journey into Shakuhachi Music 

Shakuhachi players
Ethnomusicologists
American woodwind musicians
Living people
Earlham College faculty
Year of birth missing (living people)